State Route 416 (SR 416, also known locally as Pittman Center Road) is a secondary highway that runs south to north, entirely in Sevier County, Tennessee.

Route description

SR 416 begins in Pittman Center at US 321 and it ends at US 411 in eastern Sevierville. It is a two-laned road that curves through hilly terrain and farmland, and it is commonly used as an alternate route to bypass peak time traffic in Sevierville and Pigeon Forge on  US 441. Junctioning with SR 454, near the convergence of Upper Middle Creek Road and Birds Creek Road, it may be used to reach the Gatlinburg Arts and Crafts Community.

Junction list

See also
List of Tennessee state highways
Tennessee Department of Transportation

External links

Mapquest

416
Transportation in Sevier County, Tennessee